Myidae, common name the softshell clams, is a taxonomic family of marine bivalve molluscs in the order Myida.

Genera
Genera within the family Myidae include:
 Cryptomya (Conrad, 1848)
Cryptomya californica (Conrad, 1837) – California softshell
 Mya Linnaeus, 1758
Mya arenaria Linnaeus, 1758 – soft-shell clam
 Mya baxteri Coan and Scott, 1997    
 Mya elegans (Eichwald, 1871)    
 Mya japonica Jay, 1856    
 Mya priapus (Tilesius, 1822)    
 Mya profundior Grant and Gale, 1931 
 Mya pseudoarenaria Schlesch, 1931 
 Mya truncata Linnaeus, 1758 
 Mya uzenensis Nomura and Zimbo, 1937
 Paramya Conrad, 1860    
 Paramya subovata (Conrad, 1845)
 Platyodon
Platyodon cancellatus (Conrad, 1837) – boring softshell
 Sphenia Turton, 1822
 Sphenia antillensis Dall and Simpson, 1901 
 Sphenia binghami Turton, 1822
 Sphenia luticola (Valenciennes, 1846)
 Sphenia ovoidea Carpenter, 1864
 Sphenia sincera Hanks and Packer, 1985
 Sphenia tumida J. E. Lewis, 1968

References
 

 
Bivalve families
Taxa named by Jean-Baptiste Lamarck